The Formosan sambar (Rusa unicolor swinhoei)  is a subspecies of the sambar found in Taiwan. It is the largest native herbivore there. Its fur color changes with season to provide camouflage. It is yellowish-brown in the summer and dark brown in the winter.

References 

Rusa (genus)
Subspecies